Al-Sheikh Hussein FC is a football club in Jordan and currently part of the Jordan League Division 2 found in Al-Āghwār ash-Shamāliyah is one of the districts  of Irbid governorate , Jordan.

Current squad

Current technical staff

Managerial History 
 Ahmed Al-Rawabdeh
 Rateb Al-Awadat

External links

Sheikh Hussien
1980 establishments in Jordan